Daniel Fredrick Sartain (August 13, 1981 – March 20, 2021) was an American musician. His music encompasses a variety of genres, including rockabilly, punk rock and the blues.

Career
After releasing two self-produced albums through independent record labels, in 2005 Sartain released Dan Sartain vs. the Serpientes, his first commercially-available studio album, through the San Diego, California-based Swami Records. This was followed by Join Dan Sartain in 2006. In 2007 he toured as an opening act for The White Stripes and The Hives, releasing a new single on Jack White's Third Man Records entitled "Bohemian Grove". In 2010 Sartain released his fifth album, Dan Sartain Lives. His single "Walk Among the Cobras Pt.1" can be heard in the "Russell episode" of the video game The Walking Dead: 400 Days. 

Sartain died on March 20, 2021, at the age of 39.

Discography

Albums

Singles

Videography

Music videos

References

External links
Official website
 
 

1981 births
2021 deaths
American rock musicians
Musicians from Birmingham, Alabama
American rockabilly musicians
American blues singers
American blues guitarists
American male guitarists
American blues pianists
American male pianists
American blues drummers
Swami Records artists
One Little Independent Records artists
People from Jefferson County, Alabama
Guitarists from Alabama
Country musicians from Alabama
21st-century American pianists
21st-century American male musicians
21st-century American drummers
21st-century American guitarists